
Gmina Sulęcin is an urban-rural gmina (administrative district) in Sulęcin County, Lubusz Voivodeship, in western Poland.

The gmina contains part of the protected area called Łagów Landscape Park.

Villages
Apart from the town of Sulęcin, Gmina Sulęcin contains the villages and settlements of Brzeźno, Długoszyn, Długoszyn-Kolonia, Długoszynek, Drogomin, Glisno, Grochowo, Grzeszów, Małuszów, Miechów, Ostrów, Pamiątkowice, Podbiele, Rychlik, Trzebów, Trzemeszno Lubuskie, Tursk, Wędrzyn, Wielowieś, Żarzyn and Żubrów.

Neighbouring gminas
Gmina Sulęcin is bordered by the gminas of Bledzew, Krzeszyce, Łagów, Lubniewice, Lubrza, Międzyrzecz, Ośno Lubuskie and Torzym.

Twin towns – sister cities

Gmina Sulęcin is twinned with:

 Beeskow, Germany
 Friedland, Germany
 Kamen, Germany
 Nowy Tomyśl, Poland

References

Sulecin
Sulęcin County